Francis Oliver may refer to:

 Francis Oliver (Medal of Honor) (1832–1880), U.S. Army soldier
 Francis Wall Oliver (1864–1951), English botanist